The 2012 season of the Copa Bolívia is the first edition of the third tier of the Bolivian Football pyramid. In this edition will comprise the runners-up of the nine regional championship, the runners-up of Torneo Nacional Interprovincial 2012 and two invited teams. The host cities are Tarija and Warnes. The best three teams of the competition will be promoted to the 2012–13 Liga Nacional B.

Teams

Group stage

Group A

Group B

Semifinals

Third Place

Final

References 

Bol
Copa Bolivia (Ascenso)